Norse Atlantic Airways AS is a Norwegian low-cost, long-haul airline headquartered in Arendal, Norway. Founded in February 2021, the airline operates a fleet of Boeing 787 aircraft between Europe and North America. Its inaugural flight took place on 14 June 2022, from Oslo Airport, Gardermoen, to New York City's John F. Kennedy International Airport.

History

Establishment
Norse Atlantic Airways was founded in February 2021 by Bjørn Tore Larsen, with Bjørn Kise and Bjørn Kjos holding minority stakes. The airline was announced on 15 March 2021, alongside its plans to begin selling tickets in the fall of 2021 for the start of scheduled commercial flights in December 2021. The airline's plans also included intentions to operate twelve Boeing 787 Dreamliner aircraft previously operated by Norwegian Air Shuttle and its associated subsidiaries, establishing partnerships with other Norway-based airlines, including Norwegian Air Shuttle and startup airline Flyr, as well as floating the company onto the Oslo Stock Exchange. The airline had announced London, Oslo, and Paris in Europe, alongside Los Angeles, Miami, and New York City in the United States among its planned initial destination cities, and had additionally expressed interest in later serving destinations in Asia. To launch the company, its shareholders completed a private placement of 1.275 billion Norwegian Kroner ($150 million U.S. dollars) on 26 March 2021. On 29 March 2021, AerCap announced the signing of a lease agreement with Norse Atlantic for the airline's first nine Boeing 787s, consisting of three 787-8s and six 787-9s. Following Norse Atlantic's debut on the Oslo stock market on 12 April 2021, the company raised upwards of 1.4 billion Norwegian crowns ($165 million US dollars) in its initial public offering (IPO).

During August 2021, Norse Atlantic Airways announced that it had secured leasing rights for a further six Boeing 787-9s from BOC Aviation, increasing its planned fleet from twelve to fifteen aircraft, with deliveries beginning in 2021 and the deliveries to be completed during 2022. On 10 August 2021, the airline additionally revealed its updated corporate image and aircraft livery. Subsequently, Norse Atlantic's planned launch of operations was postponed from December 2021 to the summer of 2022, with the company citing travel restrictions related to the COVID-19 pandemic, and the start of ticket sales planned to take place approximately three months prior to launch. The airline also announced that it had applied for an air operator's certificate (AOC) in Norway, and that it planned to apply for an additional AOC in the United Kingdom. By the end of the month, airline still had not publicly specified any airports it would serve, but was later reported by the end of the month to have entered agreements with London's Gatwick Airport. In September 2021, the airline within its application to the United States Department of Transportation (USDOT) for a foreign air carrier permit outlined the operation of flights from Oslo to Fort Lauderdale, Newburgh, and Ontario airports, serving the Miami, New York City, and Los Angeles areas respectively. By November 2021, the airline was reported to have been allocated arrival and departure slots at London Stansted Airport.

On 20 December 2021, Norse Atlantic's first Boeing 787-9 was ferried to Oslo ahead of its planned spring 2022 launch of operations, and on 29 December 2021, the airline was granted its AOC by the Civil Aviation Authority of Norway. On 14 January 2022, the airline received approval from the USDOT to operate scheduled and chartered service between Europe and the USA. On 15 March 2022, a year following Norse Atlantic's public reveal, the airline announced that it planned to begin ticket sales in April 2022 with the launch of operations to occur during June 2022, and that it had been allocated slots at London's Gatwick Airport. On 11 April 2022, the airline received its approval for its foreign air carrier permit from the USDOT.

Launch of operations
Norse Atlantic opened reservations and announced its initial route network on 28 April 2022, and that flights would launch on 14 June 2022 between Oslo and New York JFK, before later operating services to Fort Lauderdale, Orlando, and Los Angeles as part of its initial network. Notably, the airline deviated from its intentions to operate to Newburgh or Ontario. On 26 May 2022, the airline announced details of operations at its first European destination outside of Oslo, with flights from London Gatwick to both its Oslo base and New York JFK to begin on 12 August 2022. The airline announced its second European destination outside of Oslo on 8 June 2022, with flights from Berlin to both New York JFK and Los Angeles, respectively on 17 and 18 August 2022.

On 28 July 2022, Norse Atlantic launched its first partnerships with other airlines, consisting of easyJet, Norwegian Air Shuttle, and Spirit Airlines to provide connecting traffic between the airlines through services provided by Dohop. For the airline's first winter schedule since launch, starting in October 2022 the airline further reduced its schedule than previously planned in line with the reduced passenger demand, with its Los Angeles and Orlando routes becoming seasonal. The airline later announced the addition of both Paris Charles de Gaulle and Rome Fiumicino as destinations to launch in March and June 2023 respectively.

On 14 February 2023, Norse Atlantic announced the launch of flights operated by its British subsidiary Norse Atlantic UK to begin in May 2023, with services between London Gatwick and Orlando beginning on 25 May 2023, and Fort Lauderdale on 26 May 2023.

Corporate affairs

Ownership
Norse Atlantic Airways is headquartered in Arendal, Norway, and is wholly owned by parent company Norse Atlantic ASA. At its establishment during early 2021, the airline was 63% owned by CEO Bjørn Tore Larsen and affiliates, 15% owned by Bjørn Kjos, and 12% by Bjørn Kise. Following the parent company's listing on the Oslo Stock Exchange, Bjørn Tore Larsen remained the majority shareholder with a 12.4% stake, followed by institutional investors such as Delphi Nordic (6.7%), DNB SMB (6.3%), and Skagen Vekst (5.9%) by January 2022.
	
Norse Atlantic also established Norse Atlantic UK as a British subsidiary on 10 May 2021, with the company receiving a British AOC and operating licence on 28 September 2022.

Branding
Norse Atlantic's corporate logo is directly inspired by the Oseberg Ship, with the airline's associated livery and branding inspired by the longships used by the vikings to cross the North Atlantic. The airline's branding was pitched and designed by Markus Lock. Its aircraft are named after various national parks located in countries served by the airline, such as Raet, Everglades, Dartmoor, and Yellowstone National Park.

Destinations
, Norse Atlantic Airways operates to the following destinations:

Interline agreements
Norse Atlantic Airways has virtual interlining agreements with the following airlines:

easyJet
Norwegian Air Shuttle
Spirit Airlines

Fleet

Current fleet
, the Norse Atlantic Airways fleet (including Norse Atlantic UK) consists of the following aircraft:

Fleet development
In March 2021, Norse Atlantic announced that it had planned to operate a fleet of 12 Boeing 787 Dreamliner aircraft, and that it had secured leasing rights for its first 9, consisting of 3 787-8s and 6 787-9s from AerCap. In August 2021, the airline leased an additional 6 787-9s from BOC Aviation, increasing its total planned fleet to 15 787s, and Norse Atlantic subsequently received its first 787-9 in December 2021. In April 2022, the airline announced it would lease 2 787-8s and 2 787-9s to Air Europa for 18 months while Norse Atlantic would undergo its initial startup operations. By 10 October 2022, the airline had received 13 of its 15 aircraft, and on 18 October 2022, it leased out a third 787-8. On 28 October 2022, lessor BOC Aviation announced it had completed delivery of its sixth 787-9 to the airline, with Norse expecting to complete delivery of all 15 787s by the end of 2022, and to operate 10 of its 15 787s starting in 2023.

Service concept
The cabins of Norse Atlantic's Boeing 787s retain the original seating configurations of their previous operators; Norwegian Air Shuttle and its associated subsidiaries, and are thus configured in two classes of service, consisting of Premium and Economy classes. Seats in its Premium cabin are configured in a 2–3–2 layout, while its Economy seats are configured in a 3–3–3 layout. As a low-cost carrier, the airline charges fees for extra services and amenities depending on class of service. Seats in both cabins are equipped with an in-flight entertainment system allowing playback of video on demand through personal screens, and the airline has additionally announced intentions to offer in-flight Wi-Fi access.

Criticism
Following Norse Atlantic's public reveal in March 2021, observers and media outlets drew comparisons to the similarity of its business model to Norwegian Air Shuttle and its long-haul operations. A factor included the presence of key executives with connections to Norwegian among Norse Atlantic's founders and investors, with Kjos serving as Norwegian's former CEO, Kise formerly serving as Norwegian's chairman, and Larsen the chairman of OSM Aviation, a company responsible for providing staff for many of Norwegian's flight operations prior to Norwegian's restructuring. Other aspects of Norse Atlantic's proposed operations additionally coincided, including its choice of destinations, and the specific Boeing 787 airframes it leased being previously operated by Norwegian, with the planes to retain the same seating configuration when operated by Norse Atlantic.

Additional parallels to Norwegian's past actions were drawn when on 24 March 2021, United States congressman Peter DeFazio urged in a statement that a foreign air carrier permit be denied to Norse Atlantic, on the basis of detrimental effects caused by the 2016 issuing of a foreign air carrier permit to Norwegian Air International, claiming the company had circumvented Norway's labor protections through Irish incorporation. In response to the allegations, Norse Atlantic CEO Bjørn Tore Larsen stated that the airline is an independent Norwegian company and had planned to have permanent employees based in the United States. During May 2021, the airline reached agreements with unions representing flight attendants including those based in the United States, prior to their employment. The British Airline Pilots Association also announced a partnership with the airline in September 2021.

See also
List of airlines of Norway

References

External links 

 Official website

Airlines of Norway
Airlines established in 2021
Norwegian brands